Helen Cross (born 1967) is an English author.

Biography
She was raised in the East Riding of Yorkshire and educated at Goldsmiths, University of London (BA) and the University of East Anglia (MA, 1998).

Cross's first novel, My Summer of Love, was published in 2001 and was the winner of a Betty Trask Award in 2002. It was made into an acclaimed film directed by Paweł Pawlikowski and starring Emily Blunt and Natalie Press. She also wrote The Secrets She Keeps, published in 2005. These two books are set in Yorkshire. Her third and latest novel, Spilt Milk, Black Coffee, was published in 2009..

Helen Cross lives in Birmingham with her husband Andy, and her two daughters, Kendra and Cleo.
She tutors at the Arvon centre.

References 
 "About: Helen Cross" biography from Pulp Net (Cross served as guest editor)
 "Top Secrets: Helen Cross", by Annie Roberts, icSolihull
 "Bloomsbury Publishing Author Biography: Helen Cross", Bloomsbury Publishing.

1967 births
Living people
Alumni of Goldsmiths, University of London
Alumni of the University of East Anglia
21st-century English women writers
Writers from Birmingham, West Midlands